The National Grid Corporation of the Philippines (NGCP) is a privately owned corporation that was created on January 15, 2009, through RA 9511. It is a consortium of three corporations, namely Monte Oro Grid Resources Corporation, Calaca High Power Corporation, and the State Grid Corporation of China. As the franchise holder and transmission service provider, it is in charge of operating, maintaining, and developing the country's state-owned power grid, controls the supply and demand of power by determining the power mix through the selection of power plants to put online (i.e., to signal power plants to produce power, as power plants will only produce power or feed their power to the transmission grid when directed by NGCP), and updates the daily power situation outlook for Luzon, Visayas, and Mindanao power grids (which can be seen on its Facebook page as well as on the business section of newspapers like The Philippine Star, Philippine Daily Inquirer, and Manila Bulletin) by determining the available generating capacity, system peak demand, and operating margin (with operating margin is determined by subtracting the available generating capacity and system peak demand, and all of which are in units of MW or megawatts). As a common carrier, it must provide non-discriminatory access to its transmission system. It is subject to the standards set by the Philippine Grid Code and the Transmission Development Plan.

History

2000s
President Gloria Macapagal Arroyo signed RA 9136 (Electric Power Industry Reform Act), which introduced market competition in the energy sector and mandated the creation of National Transmission Corporation (TransCo) on June 8, 2001. TransCo was created to take over the ownership, operations, and maintenance of the country's power grid and its related assets and facilities from another government-owned corporation National Power Corporation (NAPOCOR/NPC). TransCo was a unit of NAPOCOR before the transfer of the grid to the former on March 1, 2003.

On December 12, 2007, two consortia bid for a 25-year license to run the Philippine power grid - privatization of the management of TransCo. The consortium of Monte Oro Grid Resources Corp., led by businessman Enrique Razon, comprising the State Grid Corporation of China, and Calaca High Power Corp., won in an auction conducted by the Power Sector Assets and Liabilities Management (PSALM) Corp. as it submitted the highest offer of $3.95 billion, for the right to operate TransCo for 25 years, outbidding San Miguel Energy, a unit of San Miguel Corporation (bid of $3.905 billion), Dutch firm TPG Aurora BV, and Malaysia's TNB Prai Sdn Bhd. Jose Ibazeta, PSALM president and CEO remarked: “We are very happy about the successful turnout of the bidding for TransCo. PSALM handled the privatization of the government’s transmission business with utmost transparency and judiciousness."

On February 28, 2008, its concession agreement with TransCo was executed and became effective. The agreement between NGCP and TransCo was signed by TransCo president Arthur Aguilar, PSALM president Jose Ibazeta, and NGCP directors Walter Brown, Elmer Pedregosa and Du Zhigang.

Congress approved bicameral resolution granting franchise to NGCP to manage and operate its transmission facilities nationwide in November 2008.

On December 1, 2008, Gloria Macapagal Arroyo signed the RA 9511 which gives it the franchise to operate and maintain the transmission facilities of TransCo.

On January 15, 2009, NGCP took over the operations and management of the national transmission system from TransCo which officially started the former to operate and maintain the country's power grid and its associated assets and facilities, with Walter A. Brown as the company's first president. It continued to do the transmission projects that are under Projects Under Construction (PUC) that were unfinished by TransCo on its first few years by acquiring, building and designating parts and components of the transmission project under PUC on portions that were not yet acquired and designated by TransCo and making revisions on a project under PUC, and makes or plans any new projects through the Transmission Development Plan (TDP).

2010s
On March 26, 2010, Roque Corpuz was appointed as the company's second president, replacing Walter A. Brown. Three months later on June 20 of that same year, Henry Sy Jr. became the third NGCP president.

On August 23, 2010, Department of Energy (DOE) issued Department Order DO2010-08-0015 creating a Technical Working Group to audit NGCP system operations.

DOE issued its first Transmission Development Plan as power grid operator which is the 2009 TDP that would provide a guide for NGCP in improving the reliability of the electricity backbone in April 22, 2016. 2009 TDP contains some information made by TransCo, NGCP's predecessor in power grid operations and maintenance, such as the project components that were originally planned to be made on a particular transmission project before some or all components were changed and revisions were made on a project when NGCP is now the power grid operator.

In May 2017, TransCo accused NGCP with violating its concession agreement with the power grid operator by supposedly making too much money from its operations of the country's electricity grid. Executive Secretary Salvador Medialdea pointed out that, if indeed NGCP had violated the terms of its contract by profiting unduly from the operations of the power grid such as allowing telecommunications firms to mount their fiber optic cables on the transmission towers.

On March 7, 2018, Henry Sy Jr. resigned as president and CEO, with Chief Administrative Officer Anthony Almeda named as the company's new president.

On April 5, 2018, Energy Regulatory Commission (ERC) issued Resolution 4 ordering NGCP to procure a third party auditor for the systems operations audit but was never implemented. Shortly after, the Philippine Electricity Market Corporation through its audit committee drafted terms of reference for an independent auditor but NGCP replied that only ERC has regulatory powers over it.

On June 8, 2018, the Department of Information and Communications Technology (DICT), NGCP, and TransCo signed an agreement on Friday for a national broadband plan that will help accelerate internet connectivity nationwide. Under the agreement, the DICT will utilize TransCo’s reserved optical fiber to distribute connectivity from Luzon to Mindanao using the submarine cables that will be laid down by Facebook from the United States to Asia. The agreement plans to expand the internet connectivity in public places for free by building an additional 200,000 access points nationwide by 2022, DICT Officer-In-Charge Eliseo Rio said.

In July 2018, local officials asked NGCP to explain millions of pesos of pass-on costs to customers as a result of damage incurred as a result of typhoons. The Sangguniang Panlalawigan (SP or Provincial Board) of Ilocos Norte, for instance, passed a resolution asking the NGCP management to make a full disclosure of its request to the ERC for provisional approval of the collection of the force majeure pass-through costs from its clients.

On April 11, 2019, Energy Secretary Alfonso Cusi said his agency committed to implement institutional solutions in ensuring sufficient electricity to meet consumers’ needs, in view of thinning power supply that has at times dipped to critical levels. Cusi said “short-term answers are not enough”.

On July 26, 2019, DoE informed NGCP of the appointment of Delloitte Touche Tohmatsu India LLP-Navarro Amper and Co. as a consultant for the pilot audit of transmission facilities but NGCP replied that it cannot accede to the pilot audit as it is not a party between the consultant and the DoE.

On November 26, 2019, Senator Risa Hontiveros filed a resolution urging Congress to conduct a national security audit on the operations and facilities of NGCP amid recent revelations of foreign access and control over the country’s power transmission system. In proposed Senate Resolution 223, which Hontiveros filed, she also called on the Senate to look into the national security implications of foreign access to NGCP’s power transmission facilities. The need for immediate assessment of NGCP’s system was raised by Energy Secretary Alfonso Cusi on December 3, 2019 as he indicated it is not impossible now to operate the power system remotely from anywhere amid calls to review the 40 percent stake of State Grid Corporation of China.

On December 4, 2019, Senate probes delayed projects by NGCP as well as the already deferred initial public offering.

2020s
On May 31, 2021, DoE announced the Luzon grid was experiencing limited power reserves. The following day, according to DoE, a longer period for a red alert status over the Luzon grid was needed due to additional power plant outages.

On June 2, 2021, a lawmaker in the House of Representatives called for a congressional inquiry into the rolling brownouts experienced in Luzon.

On June 10, 2021, Cusi proposed to the Senate to allow the national government to participate in the power sector, particularly in securing reserve capacity for the country. In a Senate hearing, Cusi urged lawmakers to look into allowing the government to engage in limited power generation to augment energy supply requirements when needed. The DoE chief likewise wanted to revert to government the management of ancillary services contract to ensure the reliability of the grid and the following day, he said preventing power outages in the system will require a regulating reserve which is equivalent to four percent of the peak demand plus the capacity of the biggest power plant in the system. The reserve would be ancillary services contracted by the NGCP in preparation for the dry months. NGCP failed to secure 100 percent of firm contracts for ancillary service. Cusi noted the whole issue is not about power crisis but compliance with the terms of the contract that NGCP signed with the government.

On June 14, 2021, President Rodrigo Duterte said in his weekly address: “I hold everyone responsible to comply with regulations. Unreliable power and the recent outages in Luzon pose a serious threat not only to our COVID-19 response measures but also to our economic recovery”, apparently referring to the NGCP concession with the government.

On March 17, 2022, NGCP received Integrated Management System (IMS) re-certification for ISO 9001:2015 (Quality Management Systems), ISO 14000:2015 (Environmental Management Systems), ISO 45001:2018 (Occupational Health and Safety Management Systems), and ISO 22301:2019 (Business Continuity Management Systems). Its IMS certifications are a confirmation of the company’s strict observance of international criteria covering management and speed of processes, cost effectiveness, and streamlined services. The company has been certified for IMS processes since 2012. The company said that it is proud to have received this re-certification. This is proof that NGCP’s operations are world class and have passed muster on the international arena. Our adherence to strict standards and processes define how we do business. The public can rely on us to run the transmission business with the highest level of operational standards.

Franchise law and concession agreement 
Unlike outright sale, the concession agreement allowed the Philippine government to keep ownership of the transmission assets through TransCo, in accordance with Section 8 of Electric Power Industry Reform Act (EPIRA) or Republic Act 9136 which states that no person, company, or entity other than TransCo who shall own any transmission assets and facilities. Its franchise only covers the operations, maintenance, and expansion of the power grid. It officially started operations on January 15, 2009. Assuming it secures a renewal, it has a total of 50 years and will end on December 1, 2058. Under its franchise, it has the right to operate and maintain the transmission system and related facilities, and the right of eminent domain necessary to construct, expand, maintain, and operate the transmission system.

Acquisition and designation of lands for transmission structures and right-of-way, and construction of power line structures
As stated before, NGCP has a right of eminent domain necessary to construct, expand, maintain, and operate the transmission system under its franchise as it is able to commence and pursue eminent domain proceedings for the purpose of acquiring and designating new lands for the transmission structures and their respective foundations, and right of way (portions of a power line) that are required to carry out its responsibilities using its name which makes NGCP may act as the owner of lands where the structures and their foundations stand, right of way and entirely new structures called as replacement structures that were acquired, designated and built from January 15, 2009 or during the concession period, and once its franchise expires and concession period ends, these will be transferred to TransCo. 

Under the NGCP's concession agreement with TransCo, the TransCo name should be used as TransCo's agent if a land where the structures and foundations stand and particular portions of the power line were acquired and designated by TransCo or prior to the turnover of operations and maintenance of the power grid from TransCo to NGCP and start of concession period on January 15, 2009 even before the structures were built. Transmission structures that were already built before January 15, 2009 but the transmission line itself is not yet finished are also counted as TransCo-acquired, designated and built lands, portions of a power line or right of way, and structures. These situations are in accordance with one of the mandates of TransCo which is to handle all existing cases including right-of-way and claims which accrued until January 14, 2009 or before the turnover of operations and maintenance of the grid to NGCP and start of concession period on January 15 of the said year.

Organization 
Below is a table listing the board of directors and officials of NGCP. The NGCP organization or board of directors consists of a chairman, two vice-chairmen, and seven directors. The president serves as the head of NGCP.

Presidents
 Walter A. Brown (January 15, 2009 – March 26, 2010)
 Roque Corpuz (March 26–June 20, 2010)
 Henry Sy Jr. (June 20, 2010 – March 7, 2018)
 Anthony Almeda (March 7, 2018–present)

Business scope 
Below is a table listing the district numbers and what areas or provinces that each district covers.

Luzon

North Luzon

South Luzon

Visayas

Mindanao

See also
 List of Philippine companies
 National Transmission Corporation
 National Power Corporation

References

External links

For more details about NGCP's franchise law, EPIRA law, and power grid operator's concession agreement with TransCo, see: these websites and this PDF document.''

Electric power transmission system operators in the Philippines
Companies based in Quezon City
Electric power companies of the Philippines
Philippine companies established in 2009
Energy companies established in 2009